The Roman Catholic Diocese of Kalookan (Lat: Dioecesis Kalookana) is a diocese of the Latin Church of the Catholic Church in Metro Manila, Philippines which comprises Malabon, Navotas, and the southern portion of Caloocan.

History 
The Diocese was created by Pope John Paul II on June 28, 2003 through his apostolic letter Quoniam Quaelibet. The diocese was canonically erected on August 22, 2003, with the installation of its first bishop, Deogracias S. Iñiguez, D.D. then Bishop of Iba, Zambales. Upon Bishop Iñiguez's resignation on January 25, 2013, Antipolo Auxiliary Bishop Francisco M. De Leon, D.D. was named Apostolic Administrator of the diocese. On October 14, 2015, Pope Francis named Pablo Virgilio S. David, D.D., STh.D, auxiliary bishop of Roman Catholic Archdiocese of San Fernando in Pampanga, as the second bishop of Kalookan and installed on January 2, 2016

Statistics
There were about 1,220,000 people in the diocese , 89 percent of them, or 1,090,000, baptized Catholics. The average number of baptisms in a year between the years 2003-05 was 680. There are 36 diocesan and religious priests serving 26 parishes. The two prominent Christian religions in the diocese next to Catholicism are the Philippine Independent Church (IFI, Aglipayan) and Iglesia ni Cristo (Church of Christ).

Ordinaries

See also
Catholic Church in the Philippines

References

Kalookan
Kalookan
Kaloocan
Kaloocan